Madan Mohan Jha is an Indian politician from Darbhanga district of Bihar, India. He is a member of Bihar Legislative Council, second term Elected from Teachers Constituency. He is a former president of Bihar Pradesh Congress Committee.  He was a member of Bihar Legislative Assembly for Manigachhi from 1985 to 1995.

Political career 
Jha contested 1985 Bihar Legislative Assembly election from Manigachhi (Vidhan Sabha constituency) as an Indian National Congress candidate and won for two consecutive term.  He became a member of Bihar Legislative Council in 2014. He was appointed chief of Bihar Pradesh Congress Committee in 2018. In the year 2022, he resigned from the post and Dr Akhilesh Prasad Singh became the new president of Bihar Pradesh Congress Committee.

References

External links 

Members of the Bihar Legislative Council
Indian National Congress politicians
Bihar MLAs 1985–1990
1956 births
Living people
People from Darbhanga district
Indian National Congress politicians from Bihar
Bihar MLAs 1990–1995